The Emakumeen Euskal Bira was a women's cycling race held in the Basque Country, Spain. It was held annually from 1988 to 2019, starting out as a two-stage race and building up to five stages in 2007. One of these stages was always a double stage. It was rated a 2.1 category race from 2005 to 2017 and a 2.WWT event in 2018 and 2019.

The name of the race changed during the years, from 1988 to 2007 it was called Emakumeen Bira and from 2008 to 2011 Iurreta-Emakumeen Bira. The race ended after its 2019 edition.

Winners

Multiple winners

Wins per country

References

External links

 
Cycle races in the Basque Country
Recurring sporting events established in 1988
1988 establishments in Spain
Recurring sporting events disestablished in 2019
2019 disestablishments in Spain
Women's road bicycle races
UCI Women's World Tour races